Vine Lake Cemetery is a historic cemetery on Main Street in Medfield, Massachusetts.  First established in 1651, this  cemetery has grown and evolved over the centuries, and remains the town's only public cemetery.  Its sections include the original colonial burying ground, a section in the rural cemetery style fashionable in the 19th century, and modern sections laid out in the 20th century.  The oldest dated marker is from 1661.

The cemetery was listed on the National Register of Historic Places in 2005.

See also
 National Register of Historic Places listings in Norfolk County, Massachusetts

References

External links
 

Cemeteries on the National Register of Historic Places in Massachusetts
Cemeteries in Norfolk County, Massachusetts
Medfield, Massachusetts
National Register of Historic Places in Norfolk County, Massachusetts
1651 establishments in Massachusetts
Rural cemeteries
Cemeteries established in the 17th century